The Battle of Gorgan was a battle that took place in 900, between the Alids of Tabristan and the Samanids of Khorasan at Gorgan, northern Iran. The battle, which took place after the invasion of Khorasan by Muhammad ibn Zayd, ended with a Samanid victory and brought Tabaristan under Samanid control until restoration of Alid rule in 914. Muhammad ibn Zayd, however, was killed in action and his son was captured.

The Samanid victory was also considered a victory for Sunni Islam, against Shiaism and was celebrated in Baghdad, capital of the Abbasid Caliphate.

See also 

 Battle of Gorgan (928)

References 

Gorgan
Gorgan
900